Óðsmál is a research project, starting 1990, conducted by Guðrún Kristín Magnúsdóttir.

The research is done at Guðrún's Óðsmál-research institute, Freyjukettir – Norræn menning, in Iceland. The research is inspired by Maharishi Mahesh Yogi, founder of Transcendental Meditation. Guðrún met Maharishi in 1962.

The Óðsmál research is revealed as a series of books and online lectures reflecting many new theories and insights into spirituality, the profundity of meaning inherent in Heathenry, Paganry, Asatru (Icelandic: Ásatrú), the Viking spiritual heritage, "vor forni siður" ("our ancient tradition").

The purpose of Óðsmál is to easily make everyone literate on the symbolic language and allegory of Norse Edda poems and myths.

Books
The Óðsmál series were funded by the Icelandic Ministry of Education, Science and Culture in 2011, and Hagthenkir (the Association of Non-fiction and Educational Writers in Iceland).

Adult books
In 2015, 93 Óðsmál books have been published in two languages, Icelandic and English, including:
 Óðsmál. In Icelandic and English. Published 1996, 
 Óðsmál in fornu: efnisyfirlit vefútgáfu. In Icelandic, 2010, 
 Valhallar Óðsmál in gullnu: Handa þróuðum, vísindi, skilningur og djúp þekking forfeðra okkar enduruppgötvuð. In Icelandic, 2010, 
 Skírnismál: helgileikar: handrit handa börnum / A script for bairns: ritual performance. In Icelandic and English, 2012, 
 Óðsmál 2012: Ævi hver til uppljómunar. In Icelandic, 
 Óðsmál – The Unseen Reality: Science of Consciousness in Heathenry. In English, 2013, 
 Óðsmál – Norse Edda Spiritual Highlights: We should know why we choose to be born. In English, 2014, 
 How to Lay the Bridge Bifröst. In English, 2015, 
 Consciousness and Mother Nature: What is Pure Consciousness and what is Mother Nature? Gain intellectual understanding from Óðsmál-books. In English, 2015, 
 Baldur Höður Loki: What are we celebrating and why? Óðsmál gives intellectual understanding. In English, 2015, 
 Að leggja Bifröst lag fyrir lag. In Icelandic, 2015, 
 Baldur Höður Loki: Lesum Óðsmál til að skilja. In Icelandic, 2015, 
 Vitund og móðir náttúra: Nemum upp ámáttkar fimbulrúnir. In Icelandic, 2015, 
 Óðsmál for bairns, a series of 40 books, an English translation of Krakka-Óðsmál in fornu, (note: "bairns" means "children" in Old English), published 2014
 Krakka-Óðsmál in fornu, a series of 40 books. (Note: "krakkar" means "children" in Icelandic). Published 2011
The 40 books in the Krakka-Óðsmál in fornu series are:
 Þór 
 Ægir og Rán 
 Þríeindir 
 Þjóðvitnir, Ullur, Heimdallur 
 Tefla teitir á Iðavöllum unz koma þursamegir III 
 Syn, Glasir, Valhöll, Einherjar 
 Sif, Gefjun 
 Freyr, Skírnir, Gerður 
 Segðu mér, seiðskrati 
 Uppeldi 
 Rígur 
 Jól, þorri, gói 
 Helía, Mímir, valkyrja 
 Svinnur, vín Valföðurs, Gungnir, Glaðheimar 
 Óðinn, synir, hrafnar, eljur, Sleipnir, Valhöll 
 Týr, Fenrir, Drómi, Læðingur, Gleipnir 
 Sól og Nanna 
 Frigg, Sága 
 Fjörgyn, jörð, móðir, árstíðir, Svalinn, Mundilfari 
 Gyðjan mikla, Freyja með Brísingamen 
 Skaði, Njörður, Baldur 
 Geri, Freki, jötnar 
 Jólasveinar, álfar, gandreið  Guðin, dagarnir, reikistjörnurnar, mannsheilinn 
 Haftsænir, Gapþrosnir og fleira torskilið – ja bara óskiljanlegt 
 Ginnungagap – höfuðskepnurnar 5 
 Ginnungagap – nýsta ek niður 
 Þund, heilög vötn hlóa 
 Íslenska, samskrít 
 Huginn, Muninn, Valhöll, einherjar 
 Tært taugakerfi 
 Tröll, jötnar, þursar, vættir, dvergar, þursameyjar, framþróun 
 Urður, Verðandi, Skuld 
 Yfir heiðina með vitkanum 
 Hljóð og efni 
 Hin árborna ámáttka, Grótti, þanþol, meiðmar 
 Vitundarþroskamenntun handa öllum 
 Að heyja frið, stjórnarskrá alheims 
 Matur, melting, hegðan 
 Ósvinnan horfin, Mímir endurheimtur 

Children's books
The following are Óðsmál for bairns, a series of 40 books, an English translation of Krakka-Óðsmál in fornu, published 2014:
Óðsmál for bairns 1 Þór 
Óðsmál for bairns 2 Ægir and Rán 
Óðsmál for bairns 3 trinities 
Óðsmál for bairns 4 Þjóðvitnir, Ullur, Heimdallur 
Óðsmál for bairns 5 In Iðavellir - triguna 
Óðsmál for bairns 6 Syn Glasir Valhöll einherjar 
Óðsmál for bairns 7 Sif Easter 
Óðsmál for bairns 8 Freyr Skírnir Gerður - poem Skírnismál  
Óðsmál for bairns 9 Tell me, wizard 
Óðsmál for bairns 10 Upbringing 
Óðsmál for bairns 11 Rígur (on Edda-poem Rígsþula) 
Óðsmál for bairns 12 Yule, þorri, gói 
Óðsmál for bairns 13 Hel, Mímir, valkyrja 
Óðsmál for bairns 14 Svinnur, Valföðurs wine, Gungnir, Glaðheimar 
Óðsmál for bairns 15 Óðinn, sons, Sleipnir, Valhöll 
Óðsmál for bairns 16 Týr and Fenrir 
Óðsmál for bairns 17 Sól and Nanna 
Óðsmál for bairns 18 Frigg, Sága 
Óðsmál for bairns 19 Fjörgyn, Mother Earth 
Óðsmál for bairns 20 The Great Goddess 
Óðsmál for bairns 21 Skaði, Njörður, Baldur 
Óðsmál for bairns 22 Jötnar, Geri, Freki 
Óðsmál for bairns 23 Jólasveinar, elves, gandreið 
Óðsmál for bairns 24 Gods, days, planets, and more 
Óðsmál for bairns 25 Haftsænir, Gapþrosnir, Geirölnir, valkyrja 
Óðsmál for bairns 26 Ginnungagap and the 5 elements 
Óðsmál for bairns 27 Ginnungagap - nýsta ek niður 
Óðsmál for bairns 28 Þund 
Óðsmál for bairns 29 Sanskrit and Old Norse 
Óðsmál for bairns 30 Huginn, Muninn, Valhöll, einherjar 
Óðsmál for bairns 31 Pure nervous system 
Óðsmál for bairns 32 Tröll, jötnar, thurse-maidens, wights, dwarfs 
Óðsmál for bairns 33 Urður, Verðandi, Skuld 
Óðsmál for bairns 34 Guided bird's eye view 
Óðsmál for bairns 35 Sound and "matter" 
Óðsmál for bairns 36 Mighty old Nature 
Óðsmál for bairns 37 Consciousness-based education 
Óðsmál for bairns 38 Waging peace 
Óðsmál for bairns 39 Food, digestion, behaviour 
Óðsmál for bairns 40 Ignorance gone, Mímir regained

References

External links
https://www.youtube.com/user/Goiagodi
Many related online books and lectures are on http://www.mmedia.is/odsmal  
http://www.odsmal.org

Research projects
Icelandic culture
Modern paganism in Iceland
1990s in modern paganism